Chandrasekhar (born 3 May 1956), also known as Vagai Chandrasekhar, is an Indian stage, film and television actor working in Tamil language films, known for his histrionics. He is currently the Chairman of Tamil Nadu Eyal Isai Nataka Mandram. He played lead or supportive roles in Tamil films of the 1980s. He won the National Film Award for Best Supporting Actor for his role in the 2002 film Nanba Nanba. He contested and won from Velachery constituency in State legislative assembly election 2016 from DMK party.

Filmography

Actor

Films 

Puthiya Vaarpugal (1979)
Suvarilladha Chiththirangal (1979)
Niram Maratha Pookal (1979)
Oru Thalai Ragam (1980)
Nizhalgal (1980)
Kallukkul Eeram (1980)
Palaivana Solai (1981)
Sivappu Malli (1981)
Sumai (1981)
Rajangam  (1981)
Azhagiya Kanne (1982)
Antha Rathirikku Satchi Illai (1982)
Thookkumedai (1982)
Thaai Mookaambikai (1982)
Echchil Iravugal (1982)
Marumagale Vaazhga (1982)
Inimai Idho Idho (1983)
Ingeyum Oru Gangai (1984)
Theerppu En Kaiyil (1984)
Puyal Kadantha Bhoomi (1984)
Pudhiya Sangamam (1984)
Oomai Janangal (1984)
Naagam (1985)
Raja Gopuram (1985)
Mannukketha Ponnu (1985)
Aval Sumangalithan (1985)
Needhiyin Nizhal (1985)
Sivappu Kili (1985)
Selvakku (1986)
Maragatha Veenai (1986)
Dharma Pathini (1986)
Mahasakthi Mariamman (1986)
Solai Pushpangal (1986)
Muthal Vasantham (1986)
Ragasiyam (1986)
Mattukkara Mannaru (1986)
Adutha Veedu (1986)
Choru (1986)
Samsaram Adhu Minsaram (1986)
Oomai Vizhigal (1986)
Ninaikka Therintha Maname (1987)
Koottu Puzhukkal (1987)
Nilavai Kaiyil Pudichaen (1987)
Sigappu Malargal (1986)
Ini Oru Sudhanthiram (1987)
Ullam Kavarndha Kalvan (1987)
Thangachi (1987)
Neram Nallarukku (1987)
Shenbagame Shenbagame (1988)
Ganam Courtar Avargale (1988)
Vacha Kuri Thappathu (1988)
Illam (1988)
Raththa Dhanam (1988)
Rendum Rendum Anju (1988)
Sakkarai Pandhal (1988)
Thappu Kanakku (1988)
Pattikattu Thambi (1988)
Paarthal Pasu (1988)
Palaivanathil Pattampoochi (1988)
Senthoora Poove (1988)
Paasa Mazhai (1989)
Karagattakaran (1989)
Thiruppu Munai (1989)
Sakalakala Sammandhi (1989)
Murugane Thunai (1990)
Thai Maasam Poovaasam (1990)
Silambu (1990)
Aalay Pathu Malai Mathu (1990)
Pengal Veettin Kangal (1990)
Durga (1990)
Sathan Sollai Thattathe (1990)
Pudhu Padagan (1990)
Kizhakku Karai (1991)
Mangalyam Thanthunane (1991)
Mill Thozhilali (1991)
Purushan Enakku Arasan (1992)
Naane Varuven (1992)
Bharathan (1992)
Chinnavar (1992)
Kottai Vaasal (1992)
Endrum Anbudan (1992)
Kasu Thangakasu (1992)
Kaviya Thalaivan (1992)
Villu Pattukaran (1992)
Maravan (1993)
Madurai Meenatshi (1993)
Maharasan (1993)
Thanga Pappa (1993)
Pathini Penn (1993)
Rajadhi Raja Raja Kulothunga Raja Marthanda Raja Gambeera Kathavaraya Krishna Kamarajan (1993)
En Idhaya Rani (1993)
Ilaignar Ani (1994)
Jai Hind (1994)
Rasa Magan (1994)
Maindhan (1994)
Pudhusa Pootha Rosa (1994)
Senthamizh Selvan (1994)
Seevalaperi Pandi (1994)
Seeman (1994)
Chinna Muthu (1994)
Anbu Magan (1995)
Muthu Kaalai (1995)
Periya Kudumbam (1995)
Pullakuttikaran (1995)
Anthimanthaarai (1996)
Panchalankurichi (1996)
Thirumbi Paar (1996)
Poovarasan (1996)
Puthiya Parasakthi (1996)
Vaazhga Jananayagam (1996)
Periya Thambi (1997)
Abhimanyu (1997)
Thaayin Manikodi (1998)
Thirupathi Ezhumalai Venkatesa (1999)
Veeranadai (2000)
Pandavar Bhoomi (2001)
Kasi (2001)
Kaatrukkenna Veli (2001)
Citizen (2001)
Kamarasu (2002)
Ezhumalai (2002)
Devan (2002)
Namma Veetu Kalyanam (2002)
Nanba Nanba (2002)
Sena (2003)
Don Chera (2006)
Perarasu (2006)
Periyar (2007)
Thotta (2008)
Goa (2010)
Maanja Velu (2010)
Angusam (2014)
Veera Vamsam (2017)
Maanaadu (2021)
Selfie (2022)

Television 
Appa (Sun TV)
Veppilaikkari (Sun TV)
Therkathi Ponnu (Kalaignar TV)
Vasantham (Sun TV)
Priyamanaval (Sun TV)

Dubbing artist

References 

Living people
1954 births
Tamil male actors
Best Supporting Actor National Film Award winners
Male actors from Tamil Nadu
People from Thoothukudi district